Mark Ooijevaar (born 9 November 1983) is a Dutch speed skater who is specialised in the longer distances, 5000 and 10,000 metres.

Ooijevaar finished 9th at the 10,000 metres of the 2004 Dutch Single Distance Championships in his first senior season. Two years later he reached the 10th position at the 5,000 metres and improved his 10,000 metres result to a 7th place spot. He won the Dutch Allround Championships for students in 2006 and was named in the Dutch national team to represent the country at the 2007 Winter Universiade held in Turin on both the 5000 and 10,000 metres distances.

At the 5000 metres in Turin he accomplished a time of 6:32.71 which turned out to be the fastest race of the day and which was good for a gold medal. Favourite Ivan Skobrev finished in second position on a 2.26 seconds gap, while Andrey Burlyaev won the bronze. Ooijevaar also won the gold medal at the 10000 metres in Turin with a time of 13:28.42.

Statistics

World Competitions

Dutch Single Distance Championships

Dutch Allround Championships 
			

1983 births
Living people
Dutch male speed skaters
Speed skaters at the 2007 Winter Universiade
Medalists at the 2007 Winter Universiade
Universiade medalists in speed skating
People from Hoorn
Universiade gold medalists for the Netherlands
Sportspeople from North Holland
21st-century Dutch people